Charles Maitland Long (born 23 February 1802 in Carshalton – died 6 October 1875 in London) was the Archdeacon of the East Riding from 1854 to 1873.

The son of politician Samuel Long, he was educated at Trinity College, Cambridge. He was ordained in 1827 and held incumbencies at Woodmansterne, Whitchurch, Shropshire,  and Settrington.

References

1802 births
People from Surrey (before 1889)
19th-century English Anglican priests
Alumni of Trinity College, Cambridge
Archdeacons of the East Riding
1875 deaths
People from Carshalton